Washington Township is an inactive township in Webster County, in the U.S. state of Missouri.

Washington Township was established February 6, 1856, taking its name from George Washington.

References

Townships in Missouri
Townships in Webster County, Missouri